A county-level municipality, county-level city or county city, formerly known as prefecture-controlled city, is a county-level administrative division of the People's Republic of China. County-level cities have judicial but no legislative rights over their own local law and are usually governed by prefecture-level divisions, but a few are governed directly by province-level divisions.

A county-level city is a "city" and "county" that have been merged into one unified jurisdiction. As such it is simultaneously a city, which is a municipal entity and a county which is an administrative division of a prefecture. Most county-level cities were created in the 1980s and 1990s by replacing denser populated counties.

County-level cities are not "cities" in the strictest sense of the word, since they usually contain rural areas many times the size of their urban, built-up area. This is because the counties that county-level cities have replaced are themselves large administrative units containing towns, villages and farmland. To distinguish a "county-level city" from its actual urban area (the traditional meaning of the word "city"), the term  "" (shìqū) or "urban area", is used.

Comparable territorial divisions in other countries

In France, an equivalent of a county-level city is an agglomeration community.

While the idea of a "city" being a unit consisting of several "towns" is not a common one in English-speaking world, a somewhat similar naming convention is used for local government areas in some parts of Australia.
For example, in New South Wales such a unit may often be called a "city" (rather than a traditional "shire"), and consist of "towns". E.g. City of Blue Mountains is made of a number of towns (Katoomba, Springwood, etc.).

Another example would be "municipal government" in the Canadian province of Ontario.  Small municipalities (cities) and towns, along with urban, sub-urban and rural areas were merged or integrated into a "super" area, in part to obtain economies in administrative overhead by not having for each city and town individual library commissions, fire fighting units, health care, and other social services common to all areas.

List
As of February 2022, there are 397 county-level cities in total:

Sub-prefectural cities

A sub-prefectural city is a county-level city with powers approaching those of prefecture-level cities. Examples include, Xiantao (Hubei), Qianjiang (Hubei), Tianmen (Hubei) and Jiyuan (Henan).

See also 
 Administrative divisions of China
 Counties of the People's Republic of China
 Prefecture-level city
 List of cities in China

References
 Understanding the Chinese Economies, Rongxing Guo · 2012

Administrative divisions of China
Cou
County-level divisions of the People's Republic of China